The Nevis skink (Oligosoma toka) is a nationally vulnerable species of skink native to New Zealand. It is named in honour of the location of its habitat, the Nevis valley.

Conservation status 

As of 2012 the Department of Conservation (DOC) classified the Nevis skink as Nationally Vulnerable under the New Zealand Threat Classification System.

Similar species
The Nevis skink can be mistaken for the more common northern grass skink (Oligosoma polychroma), though tends to have a heavier body build and a less-streamlined head.

References

External links 
 Holotype specimen of Oligosoma toka held at the Museum of New Zealand Te Papa Tongarewa
 Image of a Nevis skink

Oligosoma
Reptiles of New Zealand
Reptiles described in 2011
Taxa named by David G. Chapple
Taxa named by Trent Bell
Taxa named by Stephanie N.J. Chapple
Taxa named by Kimberly A. Miller
Taxa named by Geoff B. Patterson
Taxa named by Charles H. Daugherty